Baitz is a surname. Notable people with the surname include:

Jon Robin Baitz (born 1961), American playwright, screenwriter, and television producer
Rick Baitz (born 1954), American composer

See also
Taitz